Porter Springs, also known as Porter's Springs, is an unincorporated community in Houston County, Texas, United States. It was settled before the Civil War. In the 1870s, a school and Bethlehem Baptist Church were established. In the 1930s, it had three churches, two segregated schools, and a population of 50. The population in 2000 was 50.

References

External links

Unincorporated communities in Houston County, Texas
Unincorporated communities in Texas